This article shows the roster of all participating teams at the 2022 Women's Pan-American Volleyball Cup.

Pool A

The following is the Dominican Republic's roster

Head coach:  Marcos Kwiek

1 Florangel Terrero 
2 Yaneirys Rodriguez 
4 Vielka Peralta 
5 Brenda Castillo 
7 Niverka Marte 
8 Cándida Arias 
9 Angélica Hinojosa 
14 Camila de la Rosa 
15 Madeline Guillen 
16 Yonkaira Peña 
18 Bethania de la Cruz 
22 Samaret Caraballo 
23 Gaila González 
24 Geraldine González

The following is the Costa Rica's roster:

Head coach:

The following is Peru's roster:

Head coach:

The following is the Puerto Rico's roster:

Head coach:

The following is United States' roster:

Head Coach: Brad Rostratter

10 Brionne Butler 
14 Mac May 
17 Dani Drews 
21 Roni Jones-Perry 
22 Kendall White 
26 Rhamat Alhassan 
27 Avery Skinner
28 Ashley Evans 
32 Hana Lishman 
33 Nia Reed 
34 Stephanie Samedy 
35 Tori Dilfer 
36 Madeleine Gates 
37 Ali Bastianelli

Pool B

Head Coach:

1 Alyssah Fitterer 
2 Melissa Langegger 
6 Grace Calnan 
7 Layne Van Buskirk 
10 Courtney Baker 
14 Gabrielle Attieh 
15 Trinity Solecki 
17 Kacey Jost 
19 Hannah Duchesneau 
21 Avery Heppell 
22 Kennedy Snape 
23 Laura Madill 
24 Natasha Calkins 
25 Sydney Grills

The following is Cuba's roster:

Head Coach:

The following is Colombia's roster:

Head Coach:

The following is Mexico's roster:

Head Coach:

The following is Nicaragua's roster:

Head Coach:

References

2022 squads
Women's Pan-American Cup squads